Chatham was a 90-gun ship of the line, lead ship of her class.

Career 
Built for the Navy of the Batavian Republic, the ship was incorporated in the French Navy when the First French Empire annexed the country. On 10 July, she was appointed to Missiessy's Escaults squadron. In April, her armament was reduced by ten guns, removed from the upper deck.

She was returned to the Dutch Navy in 1814, and was broken up in 1823.

Notes, citations, and references

Notes

Citations

References
 
 

Ships of the line of the French Navy
1800 ships
Napoleonic-era ships